Bondapara is a village in Kamrup rural district, in the state of Assam, India, situated in south bank of river Brahmaputra.

Transport
The village is located north of National Highway 31 and connected to nearby towns and cities like Chaygaon, Boko and Guwahati with regular buses and other modes of transportation.

See also
 Birpara
 Bongra

References

Villages in Kamrup district